Mount Douglas is a stratovolcano located south of Kamishak Bay, near the northeasternmost part of the Alaska Peninsula. It lies in the Katmai National Park and Preserve in Kenai Peninsula Borough. The mountain was officially named in 1906 after nearby Cape Douglas based on a 1904 report by USGS geologist G. C. Martin. The Alaska Volcano Observatory currently rates Douglas as Level of Concern Color Code Not Assigned.

The volcano has a warm and highly acidic crater lake approximately 160 m (525 ft) wide. In 1982, the lake had a temperature of 21 °C and a pH of 1, and temperatures of 114-118°C were measured in 1991. At the north flank of the volcano unglaciated and relatively uneroded lava flows are found. The last eruption is not known, but probably occurred during the Holocene. 



See also

List of mountain peaks of North America
List of mountain peaks of the United States
List of mountain peaks of Alaska
List of Ultras of the United States
List of volcanoes in the United States

References

Other Sources 

 Volcanoes of the Alaska Peninsula and Aleutian Islands-Selected Photographs
 Mt. Douglas - Alaska Volcano Observatory

Volcanoes of Kenai Peninsula Borough, Alaska
Stratovolcanoes of the United States
Mountains of Alaska
Volcanoes of Alaska
Volcanic crater lakes
Katmai National Park and Preserve
Aleutian Range
Mountains of Kenai Peninsula Borough, Alaska